Daniella Wang (born 6 August 1989), born Wang Lidan, is a Chinese actress and fashion model of Mongolian ethnicity. Daniella Wang rose to fame after acting in Hong Kong Category III film Due West: Our Sex Journey. Her other films include Bachelors' Love (2013), Midnight Hair (2014), Fruit Rockers (2015), and The Stormy Night (2015). She starred as Guanyin in the TV series Words of Snakes, and as Lisa Hu in Rules.

Life and career
Born in Nanyang, Henan on August 6, 1989, Daniella Wang graduated from Beijing Zhongbei King Art School.

She began her career as a fashion model in 2010, when she attended the China Fashion Underwear Model Contest.

Daniella Wang's first film role was an uncredited appearance in the film Red Rock.

Daniella Wang rose to fame after portraying Xiaosi in the Hong Kong Category III film Due West: Our Sex Journey.

In 2013, she acted alongside Chen Hao and Jill Hsu in the romantic comedy film Bachelors' Love.

In 2014, Daniella Wang was cast in the thriller film Midnight Hair, in which she played Xiaomei, the wife of Lee Wei's character. She had a minor role in The Stormy Night, which also stars Lan Yan as Dou Kou.

In 2017 she played Lisa Hu in Rules.

Filmography

Film

Television

References

External links

1989 births
People from Nanyang, Henan
Living people
Actresses from Henan
Hong Kong film actresses
Hong Kong television actresses
Hong Kong people of Mongolian descent
Chinese people of Mongolian descent